Brachynarthron is a genus of longhorn beetles of the subfamily Lamiinae, containing the following species:

 Brachynarthron aeneipennis Breuning, 1956
 Brachynarthron simile Breuning, 1964
 Brachynarthron unicoloripennis Breuning, 1968

References

Protonarthrini